Pierre L'Enfant is the son of Pierre L'Enfant and designer of modern-day Washington, D.C.

Pierre L'Enfant may also refer to:

Pierre L'Enfant (painter) (1704–1787), French painter and father of the above
SS Pierre L'Enfant, a U.S. Liberty ship, named after Pierre L'Enfant the designer of modern-day Washington, D.C.

L'Enfant, Pierre